This article is a list of neighbourhoods in Patras.

 
Patras